Mike Gilmore may refer to:

 Mikal Gilmore (born 1951), American writer and music journalist
 Mike Gilmore (footballer) (1913–1966), English footballer